Oncella is a genus of flowering plants belonging to the family Loranthaceae.

Its native range is Kenya to Mozambique.

Species:

Oncella ambigua 
Oncella curviramea 
Oncella gracilis 
Oncella schliebeniana

References

Loranthaceae
Loranthaceae genera